In condensed matter physics, the Laughlin wavefunction is an ansatz, proposed by Robert Laughlin for the ground state of a two-dimensional electron gas placed in a uniform background magnetic field in the presence of a uniform jellium background when the filling factor (Quantum Hall effect) of the lowest Landau level is  where  is an odd positive integer. It was constructed to explain the observation of the   fractional quantum Hall effect, and predicted the existence of additional  states as well as quasiparticle excitations with fractional electric charge , both of which were later experimentally observed. Laughlin received one third of the Nobel Prize in Physics in 1998 for this discovery. Being a trial wavefunction, it is not exact, but qualitatively, it reproduces many features of the exact solution and quantitatively, it has very high overlaps with the exact ground state for small systems.

If we ignore the jellium and mutual Coulomb repulsion between the electrons as a zeroth order approximation, we have an infinitely degenerate lowest Landau level (LLL) and with a filling factor of 1/n, we'd expect that all of the electrons would lie in the LLL. Turning on the interactions, we can make the approximation that all of the electrons lie in the LLL. If  is the single particle wavefunction of the LLL state with the lowest orbital angular momenta, then the Laughlin ansatz for the multiparticle wavefunction is

where position is denoted by

in (Gaussian units)

The subscripts on z identify the particle. In order for the wavefunction to describe fermions, n must be an odd integer. This forces the wavefunction to be antisymmetric under particle interchange.

Energy of interaction for two particles

The Laughlin wavefunction is the multiparticle wavefunction for quasiparticles. The expectation value of the interaction energy for a pair of quasiparticles is 

where the screened potential is (see Coulomb potential between two current loops embedded in a magnetic field)

The inverse screening length is given by (Gaussian units)

The interaction energy evaluates to:
{|cellpadding="2" style="border:2px solid #ccccff"
|

|}

To obtain this result we have made the change of integration variables 

and

and noted (see Common integrals in quantum field theory)

The interaction energy has minima for (Figure 1)

and 

References

See also 
 Landau level
 Fractional quantum Hall effect
 Coulomb potential between two current loops embedded in a magnetic field

Hall effect
Condensed matter physics
Quantum phases